Reanne Evans  (born 25 October 1985) is an English professional snooker player. She competes on the World Women's Snooker Tour, where she is a former women's world champion and former women's world number one, and also plays on the professional World Snooker Tour. She frequently features as a pundit on televised snooker coverage. She received an MBE in the 2020 Birthday Honours for her services to women's snooker. 

Evans reached the semi-finals of the World Women's Snooker Championship on her first attempt in 2002, when she was aged 16. She went on to become the most successful female player in the sport's history, winning a record 12 women's world titles, including 10 consecutively between 2005 and 2014, breaking the previous record of seven set by Allison Fisher. She also set records by winning 11 UK Women's Snooker Championships, 58 ranking titles on the women's tour overall, and 90 consecutive victories in women's matches between 2008 and 2011. She has achieved the highest break the women's tour, having made 140 on two occasions. 

Evans received a wildcard to the World Snooker Tour for the 2010–11 season, becoming the first woman to compete on the professional tour since Fisher 16 years previously. In 2013, she qualified for the Wuxi Classic as an amateur competitor, becoming the first woman to reach the final stages of a professional ranking snooker tournament. She received wildcards to the World Snooker Championship qualifying rounds in 2015 and from 2017–21. On International Women's Day in 2021, she received a two-year invitational tour card that commenced in the 2021–22 season, enabling her to enter any ranking event at the qualifying stages. At the 2023 Snooker Shoot Out, she became the first woman to win a televised match at a ranking tournament when she defeated Stuart Bingham in the last 128.

Women's snooker

World Ladies Billiards and Snooker/World Women's Snooker
Aged 16 in 2002, Evans competed in her first World Women's Snooker Championship. She defeated third seed Lynette Horsburgh 4–3 in the quarter-finals but lost 0–4 to eventual champion Kelly Fisher in the semi-finals. She won her first ranking tournament, the Connie Gough Memorial Championship, in 2004. This was the only women's ranking event held in the 2003–04 season, after Fisher, then the top female player in the rankings, had departed from the circuit to play nine-ball pool in the United States.

Evans won her first world championship in 2005 with a 6–4 victory over Horsburgh in the final, which featured one frame that was replayed because of a problem with the scoring. She retained the title in 2006 just six weeks before she was due to give birth, defeating Emma Bonney 5–3 in the final. She also won the 2006 WLBSA mixed doubles title, partnering with Mark Allen to beat Sonia Chapman and Matthew Couch 3–0 in the final.

She went on to win the World Women's Snooker Championship 10 consecutive times from 2005 to 2014, and claimed the title again in 2016 and 2019. Her total of 12 women's world titles is a record, ahead of Allison Fisher's seven.

Her loss to Maria Catalano at the 2011 Northern Classic brought to an end an unbeaten run of 90 women's snooker matches.

She won the 2019 Women's Tour Championship, held at the Crucible Theatre, beating Nutcharut Wongharuthai in the semi-finals and Ng On-yee in the final.

In September 2021, following an 18-month suspension of the Women's Snooker Tour due to the COVID-19 pandemic, Evans won the 2021 UK Women's Championship, defeating Rebecca Kenna 4–0 in the final. In November 2021, she was runner-up to Ng in the Eden Women's Masters, losing the final 3–4 after having led 3–1. In January 2022, she lost 3–4 to Wongharuthai in the final of the British Women's Open. At the 2022 World Women's Snooker Championship in February, Evans was the defending champion, but she lost 1–4 to Belgian player Wendy Jans in the quarter-finals, the first time she had not reached at least the semi-finals of the tournament. She retained her number one place in the women's world rankings at the end of the 2021–22 season, although Ng and Wongharuthai closed the gap in ranking points.

International Billiards and Snooker Federation
Evans won the IBSF Women's Snooker Championship in 2004, 2007, and 2008. She did not travel to the 2009 championship in Hyderabad to defend her title as the cost of travelling would have been more than the prize money she could have earned.

European Billiards and Snooker Association
Evans won the EBSA European Snooker Championship in 2007 and 2008.

World Snooker Tour
After winning 61 consecutive women's matches and defeating reigning world champion John Higgins 4–3 at the 2009 Six-red World Championship, Evans was awarded a wildcard on the professional tour for the 2010–11 season, enabling her to enter all ranking events at the qualifying stage. This made her the first woman to play on the main tour since Allison Fisher in 1994–95. Evans failed to win a match throughout her season on the tour, suffering 18 consecutive defeats. She entered Q-School, but was unable to qualify for the main tour in the 2011–12 season.

In the 2012–13 season, Evans won enough Q-School matches to earn a "top-up" place in the qualifying rounds for the 2013 Wuxi Classic, competing as an amateur. In her qualifying match, she defeated Thepchaiya Un-Nooh 5–4 to become the first woman to reach the final stages of a ranking snooker tournament. Originally scheduled to play world number two Neil Robertson in the last 64, she then became one of four players selected to play an extra wildcard round against local Chinese opponents. She lost 2–5 to Chinese teenager Zhu Yinghui in the wildcard round.

In March 2015, Evans was awarded a place in the qualifying rounds of the 2015 World Snooker Championship. She lost her opening match 8–10 to 1997 world champion Ken Doherty.

In the qualifying rounds for the 2017 World Snooker Championship, Evans defeated Robin Hull 10–8 in the first round, calling the victory the best of her career to that point. She lost 6–10 to Lee Walker in the second round of qualifying. In the next four world championships, she exited in the first qualifying round each year, losing 7–10 to Dominic Dale in 2018, 2–10 to Zhang Yong in 2019, 3–6 to Andy Hicks in 2020, and 2–6 to Hicks in 2021.

At the 2019 Champion of Champions, Evans became the first female player to compete in the event. She lost 3–4 to Shaun Murphy in the first round, after coming back from 0–3 down to force a deciding frame.

On International Women's Day in 2021, World Snooker announced that Evans and Ng On-yee, the top-two players in the women's world rankings, would receive two-year invitational tour cards to commence in the 2021–22 snooker season. In the second ranking event of the season, the British Open, Evans was drawn in the first round against Mark Allen, her former partner and father of her daughter, with whom she had a strained relationship following a dispute over child support. Evans refused Allen's offer of a handshake before the match began. She took a 2–1 lead and led 60–22 in the fourth frame, but Allen came back to win 3–2. Evans did not win any matches during her season on the tour, which ended with a 2–6 defeat to Lee Walker in the first round of qualifying for the 2022 World Snooker Championship. Following her loss to Walker, Evans posted on social media that the "last year or so has been tough on and off [the] table" but that she was "working on it". At the end of the 2021–22 season, Evans was entered into the Snooker Hall of Fame, along with Allison Fisher, for "outstanding contributions to the growth of snooker".

The 2022–23 snooker season saw Evans again fare poorly on the main tour, although she defeated Stuart Bingham by 60 points to 8 in their one-frame match at the 2023 Snooker Shoot Out, becoming the first woman to win a televised match at a ranking snooker tournament.

Personal life
Born in Dudley, West Midlands, Evans was educated at Bishop Milner Catholic School, Dudley. She began playing snooker at age 13, inspired by her older brothers. In 2005, she began a relationship with Northern Irish professional snooker player Mark Allen, with whom she had a daughter, Lauren Sophie, born at Russells Hall Hospital in May 2006. Both parents were 20 when their daughter was born. Evans and Allen ended their relationship in 2008.

Performance and rankings timeline

World Snooker Tour

World Women's Snooker

Career finals

Women's finals: 87 (73 titles)